This is a list of wars that began between 1900 and 1944. Other wars can be found in the historical lists of wars and the list of wars extended by diplomatic irregularity. Major global conflicts of this period are World War I and World War II, while major continental conflicts include the Chinese Civil War in Asia, the Banana Wars in North America, the Italo-Turkish War in Africa, the Spanish Civil War in Europe, and the Chaco War in South America.



1900–1909

1910–1919

1920–1929

1930–1944

Notes

References 

1900-1944
1900-1944